Oscar Antonio Más (born October 29, 1946) is an Argentine former football striker. He played the majority of his career for River Plate, and is the club's second highest goalscorer of all time.

He was born in the city of Villa Ballester in the Buenos Aires Province of Argentina. He made his debut in the Argentine First Division at the age of 17 in 1964, with River Plate. He would go on to win two titles with River Plate, both the titles contested in 1975. He was twice the top scorer in the Argentine Primera and once top scorer in the Copa Libertadores. In total, he scored 199 goals in 382 games for River, being their second-most prolific scorer behind Angel Labruna.

Más also played for Real Madrid for a spell, América de Cali in Colombia, Quilmes, Sarmiento, Mariano Moreno, El Porvenir, Defensores de Belgrano, Huracán Las Heras de Mendoza and Talleres de Remedios de Escalada in Argentina.

By the end of his career he had scored 215 goals in 329 games in the Argentine Primera, making him the 7th highest scoring player since the professional era began in 1931.

National team
Más represented Argentina on 37 occasions between 1965 and 1972 including at the 1966 World Cup. He scored 10 goals in his international career.

Investigative journalism and lawsuit for fraud
On Monday June 29, 2009, Oscar Más was convicted to a six months suspended sentence for fraud, during an abbreviated trial after being arrested the previous day while he was voting in a San Isidro school, in the northern area of Greater Buenos Aires, on the occasion of the parliamentary elections of June 2009. The former player had an arrest warrant for breaking legal action under a suspension of trial by which he was benefited on a fraud lawsuit, as legal sources stated.

Más was arrested in a police station and was transferred the next day to the warden of the Palace of Justice to appear before the Oral Criminal Court No. 7 that sought his arrest, by judges Daniel Morin, Gustavo Valle and Juan Giúdice Bravo. The detention order was made because he did not comply with probation that justice had issued in December 2006 to not to go to trial because of the complaint against him.

The former player should have reported periodically to the board of trustees of the Freed, which he failed to do, and he wasn't located in the home that he had fixed so the court declared his rebellion and ordered his arrest. However, until the decision is final, he shall remain free.

On its issue of Friday July 10, 2009, the investigative news program Documentos América, issued by the channel América TV, revealed a hidden camera which presented Oscar Más demanding money from parents of children, in exchange for providing the latest a precarious training and eventual admission to the lower divisions of River Plate.

Honours

Topscorer awards

References

External links
 Brief bio at the official River Plate-dedicated web site 
  
 Museo dos Esportes entry 

1946 births
Living people
Sportspeople from Buenos Aires Province
Argentine footballers
Argentina international footballers
1966 FIFA World Cup players
Association football forwards
Club Atlético River Plate footballers
Real Madrid CF players
América de Cali footballers
Quilmes Atlético Club footballers
Defensores de Belgrano footballers
Club Atlético Sarmiento footballers
Talleres de Remedios de Escalada footballers
Argentine Primera División players
La Liga players
Categoría Primera A players
Argentine expatriate footballers
Expatriate footballers in Spain
Expatriate footballers in Colombia
1967 South American Championship players